Vergunst is a surname. Notable people with the surname include:

Flora Lagerwerf-Vergunst (born 1964), Dutch judge, politician and educator
Nicolaas Vergunst (born 1958), South African writer

Surnames of Dutch origin